Jairo Junior Talledo Márquez (born 19 March 1987) is a Peruvian footballer who plays as a full back for Unión Comercio.

Club career
Talledo played for Copa Perú side Defensor Porvenir in the 2008 season.

Then in January 2010 he joined Unión Comercio, which at the time was in the Copa Perú division. He helped the club win the title that season and reach promotion for the following season.

Talledo made his debut in the Torneo Descentralizado in the Third Round of the 2011 season
in the 2–0 at home against Alianza Atlético. In his fourth league game of the season he scored his first goal in the Descentralizado in the 2–1 home win over Universidad San Martín.

References

1987 births
Living people
People from Chimbote
Association football fullbacks
Peruvian footballers
Unión Comercio footballers
Peruvian Primera División players